Jinping County is a county in the east of Guizhou province, China, bordering Hunan to the east. It is under the administration of the Qiandongnan Miao and Dong Autonomous Prefecture.

Languages

Dong
Dong (also known as the Kam language) is the most widely spoken non-Chinese language in Jinping County. The three main dialects of Dong are the Jiuzhai, Datong, and Qimeng dialects (Tu & Yang 2008: 105).
Jiuzhai dialect: Northern Dong, first lectal area. Spoken in Pingqiu, Kuidan, Gaoba, Huangmen, and Yandong townships. Representative dialect: Pisuo Village in Gaoba Township.
Datong dialect: Northern Dong, third lectal area. Spoken in Datong, Suijiang, and Xiudong townships. Representative dialect: Xiudong Village.
Qimeng dialect: Southern Dong, first lectal area. Spoken in Qimeng, Juzhai, and Shengli townships. Representative dialect: Zhemeng Village in Qimeng Town.

Miao
Eastern Miao (also known as the Hmu language) is spoken as a first language by about 40,000 people in Jinping County. There are three main Miao dialects spoken in Jinping County, with their respective geographical distributions listed as follows (Tu & Yang 2008: 50).

1. Hekou dialect (10,000+ speakers)
Qimeng District: Hekou and Wenniu townships
Pinglve District: Zhanghua Township

2. Ouli dialect (20,000+ speakers)
Pinglve District: Pinglve, Ouli, Zhaizao, and Jiaosan townships
Sanjiang District: Maoping, Guazhi, Pingjin, and Suijiang townships
Dunzhai District: Loujiang and Tongpo townships
Note: Ouli  has some notable internal dialectal differences. For example, the dialect spoken in Ouli has some differences from the dialect spoken in Loujiang, Tongpo, and Suijiang.

3. Yuhe dialect (about 3,000 speakers)
Qimeng District: Yuhe, Xinmin, and Guben townships
Note: Yuhe is the most divergent dialect.

Climate

References

 
Counties of Qiandongnan Prefecture